Hal Lublin is an American actor, improv performer, and voice-over artist best known for his work on the Thrilling Adventure Hour and Welcome to Night Vale.

Career 
Lublin has studied improvisational comedy with The Groundlings, The Second City, and iO West. He does voice work, including animation, commercials, and video games. He voiced a lead character in the animated series Slammo & Sloshie. Since 2006, Lublin has been featured in a video series for Symantec as Hal, The IT Admin.

Lublin co-creates UN-imations with Len Peralta, which are improvised pieces of art in which Lublin provides a voice and Peralta must create a drawing from scratch based upon that voice.

It was announced in September 2015 that Lublin would be appearing in season six of The Venture Bros.

He is a frequent guest on EW Radio's L.A. Daily on Sirius XM.

Podcasts 
Lublin has been a WorkJuice player on the Thrilling Adventure Hour starting in 2005, when it started as a stage show at M Bar in Los Angeles, through the end of its formal run in 2015. His roles included the announcer for the segment Beyond Belief, Gummy to Craig Cackowski's Banjo in Mooonshine Holler, Phillip Fathom, and numerous other recurring characters.

In October 2013 Lublin joined the popular podcast Welcome to Night Vale, first voicing Steve Carlsberg in a live episode performed in Brooklyn. Lublin has also been a frequent guest in The David Feldman Show.

Lublin and fellow WorkJuice Player Mark Gagliardi launched We Got This with Mark and Hal, a podcast in which the two provide definitive answers to pointless debates, in February 2015. In July 2015 the podcast joined the Maximum Fun podcast network.

Lublin also hosts a weekly wrestling podcast Tights and Fights, which wraps up the week in wrestling, covering major events and storylines.

Personal life 
Originally from Philadelphia, Lublin graduated from Syracuse University in 1999.

Filmography

Television

Podcasts

References

External links 
 
 
 
 

Living people
1977 births
American male television actors
American male comedians
American male voice actors
21st-century American male actors
Syracuse University alumni
21st-century American comedians